Benjamin Thiéry (born 6 February 1984) is a French former rugby union player.

He has played for the Section Paloise, US Colomiers, Biarritz, Montpellier, Grenoble and Bayonne clubs, and he was also included in France's mid-year Test squad for 2007.

External links
 itsrugby.fr profile
  lequipe profile

1984 births
Living people
French rugby union players
Rugby union fullbacks
France international rugby union players
Sportspeople from Reims